Gorjana Reidel (born 1978) is an American jewelry designer based in Laguna Beach, California. She co-founded the jewelry line gorjana in 2004, alongside her husband Jason Griffin Reidel.

Early years and education 
Reidel immigrated to the US from Serbia when she was a child. Both she and her husband are former models who each earned a degree in marketing from Arizona State University.

Gorjana (company) 
Reidel and her husband launched the jewelry brand gorjana in 2004.

In 2016, the Reidels opened their first jewelry brand store in Laguna Beach, followed by a second store in Venice Beach. The 2018 opening of another store in the West Village was their first in New York City. In August 2019 they opened a store in Malibu.

The couple and the company have since opened 13 stores on both coasts, with plans for an aggressive retail expansion. Today the multi-million-dollar company has over 100 employees and more than 1,000 retailers worldwide.

Style 
Of the "more is more" mindset, Gorjana's pieces are made to mix, match and layer. Her versatile, adjustable pieces offer the wearer the chance for self-expression and endless layering possibilities. Her designs have attracted celebrities such as Josephine Skriver, Olivia Wilde and Jessica Alba. 

A leader in contemporary jewelry, the gorjana line is found in over 1,000 department and specialty retail stores throughout the U.S.A.

Private life 
Reidel and her husband were married in 2003 and have two children.

References

1978 births
Living people
American jewelry designers
American people of Serbian descent
Serbian expatriates in the United States
Serbian designers
American philanthropists
Women jewellers